Bohemond or Bohemund, rarely Boamund, can refer to:

Bohemond I of Antioch (1058–1111)
Bohemond II of Antioch (1108–1130)
Bohemond III of Antioch (1144–1201)
Bohemond IV of Antioch & I of Tripoli (1172–1233)
Bohemond V of Antioch & II of Tripoli (1199–1252)
Bohemond VI of Antioch & III of Tripoli (1237–1275)
Bohemond VII of Antioch & IV of Tripoli (1261–1287)
Bohemond I of Manoppello (died 1156)
Bohemond II of Manoppello (died 1169)
Bohemond I, Archbishop of Trier (died 1299)
Bohemond II, Archbishop of Trier (died 1367)
Bohemond, Duke of Apulia (born 1182)
Bohemond of Astarac (died after 1176)
Bohemond the Turk, around the time of the First Crusade